Scheels is an American privately held, employee-owned and operated sporting goods and entertainment chain store headquartered in Fargo, North Dakota. Scheels operates thirty-three store locations in fifteen U.S. states. Its slogan is "Gear. Passion. Sports."

History
Scheels began as a hardware and general merchandise store in Sabin, Minnesota, in 1902. Frederick A. Scheel, a German immigrant, used the $300 he earned from his first harvest of potatoes as the down payment on the first Scheels, which was a hardware store.

Scheels started adding a small selection of sporting goods to its stores in 1954. Over the years, Scheels opened in surrounding communities, including Fargo, North Dakota. Fargo is currently the site of Scheels corporate headquarters. Scheels' first all-sports superstore opened in Grand Forks, North Dakota, in 1989. This store relocated to Columbia Mall in 2014.

CEO Steve M. Scheel, great-grandson of Frederick A. Scheel, oversees the company of over 7,000 associates. His father, Steve D. Scheel, is the chairman of the board.

Locations

Scheels owns and operates thirty-one stores in fourteen U.S. states. Scheels can be found in Springfield, Illinois. In Iowa, stores are located in Cedar Falls, Coralville, Sioux City, and West Des Moines. In Minnesota, stores are located in Eden Prairie, Mankato, Moorhead, St. Cloud, and Rochester. In South Dakota, Sioux Falls and Rapid City. Montana has three locations, Billings, Missoula, and Great Falls. Nebraska, has two as well, in Lincoln and Omaha. Wisconsin has two locations, in Eau Claire and Appleton. Texas has one, located in The Colony. Utah also has a location, in Sandy. Colorado has two locations, one in Johnstown, Colorado and the newest location is in Colorado Springs, Colorado.

The headquarters are located in Fargo, North Dakota, along with two stores, one traditional all-sports store, and a store focusing on home and hardware store that is now in the old sports store after being in its University Drive location since 1962. All-sports stores are also located in Bismarck, Grand Forks, and Minot. Stores can also be found in Rapid City and Sioux Falls, South Dakota. Scheels is also located in Appleton and Eau Claire, Wisconsin. On June 25, 2011, a new Scheels location opened in Springfield, Illinois. The Sandy, Utah, store opened September 29, 2012.

On December 3, 2012, Scheels announced that it would be opening the company's new flagship store in Overland Park, Kansas, in the Corbin Park outdoor retail village. The store would be a 222,000-square-foot, two-story building.  CEO Steve Scheel said that he had grand plans for the interior of the store. Customers will enter the store under a 16,000-gallon aquarium, complete with a coral reef and scuba divers to feed the fish daily. A 65-foot, 16-car Ferris wheel also will be in the store, in addition to sport simulators and a walk of U.S. presidents.  Scheels opened its new flagship store in Overland Park, Kansas, on June 27, 2015.

On June 3, 2015, Scheels announced plans to open a store in Johnstown, Colorado on September 30, 2017.

In May 2020, the Scheels in The Colony, Texas opened its doors.  At , this store is the largest Scheels and largest all-sports store in the world 

On July 11, 2020, Scheels opened a two-story,  store at the Eden Prairie Center in Eden Prairie, MN.

On May 19, 2020, Macerich announced that Scheels will open its first Arizona location at Chandler Fashion Center in the fall of 2023, replacing a vacant Nordstrom.

Scheels Outfitter brand
Scheels Outfitters is a premium brand exclusive to Scheels. Merchandise is designed for field experts by "Scheels Experts".  This includes gear for camping, fishing, and hunting.

See also

 Academy Sports + Outdoors
 Bass Pro Shops
 Cabela's
 Coral Ridge Mall
 Dick's Sporting Goods
 Gander Mountain
 Legendary Whitetails
 Sportsman's Warehouse
 List of North Dakota companies

References

External links

 

1902 establishments in Minnesota
Clay County, Minnesota
Companies based in Fargo–Moorhead
Employee-owned companies of the United States
Fargo, North Dakota
Online retailers of the United States
Privately held companies based in Minnesota
Privately held companies based in North Dakota
Retail companies established in 1902
Sporting goods retailers of the United States